Peter van der Linden (born 1963) is an American technologist and author.  He has worked for companies such as Sun Microsystems and Apple Computer, and has written books on Java, C, Linux, and practical jokes.  He is currently (2021) a Technology Consultant in Silicon Valley.

References

External links 
 Peter van der Linden homepage

1963 births
Living people
Dutch computer programmers
Dutch technology writers
Self-help writers
Solaris people
Utrecht University alumni